Cyprus sent a team to compete at the 2008 Summer Olympics in Beijing, China. Tennis player Marcos Baghdatis was ruled out of the Beijing Olympics tennis tournament due to a wrist injury  which brought the country's team to 17 athletes.

Archery

Cyprus had qualified one archer in the women's competition.

Athletics

Men
Field events

Women
Track & road events

Field events

Sailing 

Men

Women

Open

M = Medal race; EL = Eliminated – did not advance into the medal race; CAN = Race cancelled

Shooting

Men

Women

Swimming

Women

Weightlifting

External links
Official Cypriot Olympic website

References

Nations at the 2008 Summer Olympics
2008
Summer Olympics